The painted tree frog (Tlalocohyla picta) is a species of frog in the family Hylidae found in Belize, Guatemala, Honduras, and Mexico. Its natural habitats are subtropical or tropical dry forests, subtropical or tropical moist lowland forests, freshwater marshes, intermittent freshwater marshes, pastureland, plantations, rural gardens, heavily degraded former forests, ponds, and canals and ditches.

References

Tlalocohyla
Frogs of North America
Amphibians of Central America
Amphibians of Mexico
Amphibians described in 1901
Taxa named by Albert Günther
Taxonomy articles created by Polbot